The 2022–23 season is Liverpool Football Club's 131st season in existence and their 61st consecutive season in the top flight of English football. In addition to the domestic league, they also participated in this season's editions of the FA Cup, EFL Cup and UEFA Champions League.

Liverpool kicked off the season with a 3–1 victory over Premier League champions Manchester City in the FA Community Shield for their 16th Community Shield and 68th official trophy, the latter being an English record.

The season is the first since 2015–16 without Sadio Mané, who transferred to Bayern Munich, and the first since 2014–15 without Divock Origi, who departed to AC Milan.

Kits

First-team squad
As of 15 March 2023

New contracts

Transfers

In

Out

Loans in

Loans out

Transfer summary

Spending

Summer:  £ 77,900,000

Winter:  £ 37,000,000

Total:  £ 114,900,000

Income

Summer:  £ 59,500,000

Winter:  £ 0

Total:  £ 59,500,000

Net Expenditure

Summer:  £ 18,400,000

Winter:  £ 37,000,000

Total:  £ 55,400,000

Pre-season and friendlies
Liverpool announced they would be touring South East Asia, starting with a match against rivals Manchester United in Bangkok on 12 July, followed by a trip to Singapore to face Crystal Palace on 15 July. On 16 June, the Reds announced a further two pre-season matches, against RB Leipzig and Strasbourg, and later announced another friendly against Red Bull Salzburg in Austria on 27 July.

During the mid-season break as a result of the 2022 FIFA World Cup, Liverpool announced they would be travelling to Dubai to take part in the Dubai Super Cup friendly tournament, facing Lyon and Milan on 11 and 16 December, respectively.

Competitions

Overall record

Premier League

League table

Results summary

Results by round

Matches

The league fixtures were announced on 16 June 2022, with the season starting on 6 August.

FA Cup

The club entered the competition in the third round and were drawn at home to Wolverhampton Wanderers. They were drawn away to Brighton & Hove Albion in the fourth round.

EFL Cup

Liverpool were drawn away to Manchester City in the fourth round.

FA Community Shield

The traditional season curtain raiser was played between the previous season's league champions and FA Cup winners. As winners of the 2021–22 FA Cup, Liverpool faced 2021–22 Premier League champions Manchester City. Normally played at Wembley Stadium, this season it was played at Leicester City's King Power Stadium to avoid clashes with the UEFA Women's Euro 2022 competition.

UEFA Champions League

Liverpool entered the competition in the group stage.

Group stage

The draw for the group stage was held on 25 August 2022, with the fixtures announced two days later.

Knockout phase

Liverpool advanced to the knockout phase as group runners-up.

Round of 16
The round of 16 draw took place on 7 November, and Liverpool were drawn to Real Madrid, who they last met in the 2022 final.

Squad statistics

Appearances
Players with no appearances are not included on the list.

Goals

Assists

Clean sheets

Disciplinary record

References

External links

Liverpool F.C. seasons
Liverpool F.C.
Liverpool F.C.
English football clubs 2022–23 season